The Benny Hill Show  is a British comedy television show starring Benny Hill that aired on the BBC and ITV (from 1969) between 15 January 1955 and 1 May 1989. The show consisted mainly of sketches typified by slapstick, mime, parody, and double entendre.

At its peak The Benny Hill Show was among the most-watched programmes in the UK with the audience reaching more than 21 million viewers in 1971. In 1972, Hill received a BAFTA Television Award for Best Writer, and he was nominated for the BAFTA for Best Entertainment Performance. In the late 1970s, the Thames Television version of the show gained a following in the United States and would run in syndication until 1991. In 1980 and 1981, it received Emmy Award nominations for Outstanding Variety. In 1984 Hill received a Rose d'Or.

Thames cancelled production of the show in 1989 due to declining ratings and large production costs at £450,000 per show. In a 2015 UK poll the show's theme song was voted number 1 on the ITV special The Sound of ITV – The Nation's Favourite Theme Tune.

Show format

The Benny Hill Show features Benny Hill in various short comedy sketches and occasional, extravagant musical performances by artists of the time. Hill appears in many different costumes and portrays a vast array of characters. Slapstick, burlesque, and double entendres are his hallmarks. Critics accused the show of sexism and objectification of women, but Hill argued that the female characters kept their dignity while the men who chase them were portrayed as buffoons (due to silly predicaments that the men themselves caused to the women (probably because the male characters find them "attractive" to them)).

The show often uses undercranking and sight gags to create what Hill called "live animation", employing comedic techniques such as mime and parody. The show typically closes with a sped-up chase scene involving Hill and often a crew of scantily clad women (usually with Hill being the one chased, due to silly predicaments that he himself caused), accompanied by the instrumental "Yakety Sax", in a send-up on the stereotypical Keystone Cops chase scenes. Hill also composed and sang patter songs and often entertained his audience with lengthy high-speed double-entendre rhymes and songs, which he recited or sang in a single take.

Hill also used the television camera to create comedic illusions. For example, in a murder mystery farce entitled "Murder on the Oregon Express" from 1976 (a parody of Murder on the Orient Express), Hill used editing, camera angles and impersonations to depict a Quinn Martin–like TV "mystery" featuring Hill in the roles of 1970s American television detectives Ironside, McCloud, Kojak and Cannon, plus Hercule Poirot.

During his television career, Hill performed impersonations or parodies of such American celebrities as W. C. Fields, Orson Welles (renamed "Orson Buggy"), Kenny Rogers, Marlon Brando, Raymond Burr, and fictional characters that range from The Six Million Dollar Man and Starsky and Hutch to The A-Team (parodied as "The B-Team", in which he played the roles of both 'Hannibal' and 'B.A.') and Cagney & Lacey. He also impersonated such international celebrities as Nana Mouskouri and Miriam Makeba as well as British stars such as Shirley Bassey, Michael Caine (in his Alfie role), newscasters Reginald Bosanquet, Alan Whicker and Cliff Michelmore, pop-music show hosts Jimmy Savile and Tony Blackburn, musician Roger Whittaker, his former 1960s record producer Tony Hatch, political figures Lord Boothby and Denis Healey and Irish comedian Dave Allen. On a few occasions, Hill even impersonated his former straight man, Nicholas Parsons. A spoof of Who's Afraid of Virginia Woolf? saw him playing both Richard Burton and Elizabeth Taylor.

Production notes
The show's closing theme tune, "Yakety Sax", which has gained a following in its own right, was written by James Q. "Spider" Rich and Boots Randolph. As the closing credits rolled, the theme was usually accompanied by a sped-up chase-sequence, often featuring scantily clad young women. The show's musical director was pianist and easy listening conductor Ronnie Aldrich, and vocal backing was provided by session singers the Ladybirds (who also frequently appeared on camera from 1969 to 1974). The saxophone soloist on Aldrich's version of "Yakety Sax" was Peter Hughes. For three episodes of the 1973–1974 season, Albert Elms filled in for Aldrich as musical director. "Yakety Sax" first appeared in the 19 November 1969 episode, which was also the first show for Thames.

Another signature of the show was the enthusiastic announcer intro: "Yes! It's The Benny Hill Show!" (The announcer was often cast member Henry McGee.) From 1975 forward, Hill was also introduced at the start of each show as "The Lad Himself". The show closed with Hill's salute: "Thank you for being with us, and we look forward to seeing you all again—very, very soon. Until then, bye bye.".

Characters

Hill created both long-running fictional characters, such as Fred Scuttle, and frequently spoof impersonations of other TV personalities of the day, usually tweaking names for comic effect:

Johnny and Cranny Faddock (Johnny and Fanny Cradock) 
Husky and Starch (Starsky and Hutch)
Cinema with Clive Janes (Clive James)
Charlene's Angels/ Archie's Angels (Charlie's Angels)
The Scarlet Pimple (The Scarlet Pimpernel)
Barry Normal (Barry Norman)
James Gaulstone (James Galway)

Cast
The main supporting cast included Henry McGee, Jon Jon Keefe, Ken Sedd, Nicholas Parsons, Bob Todd and Jackie Wright.

The regular sexpot-type women include Jenny Lee-Wright, Sue Bond, Bettina Le Beau, Lesley Goldie, Cherri Gilham and Diana Darvey. In later years, the show included a dance troupe, the Hill's Angels, which was briefly preceded by the Love Machine. Regular Angels were Sue Upton and Louise English, whilst Jane Leeves also appeared as a Hill's Angel in a few episodes in the early 1980s; among those who appeared only once were Susan Clark and Sue McIntosh.

The female singing group The Ladybirds, featuring the bespectacled Maggie Stredder, were regulars on the show as background singers to Hill, and occasionally singing numbers on their own.

Character actresses include Anna Dawson, Bella Emberg, Rita Webb, Helen Horton, and Patricia Hayes.

Guest stars

Occasionally, Hill would briefly chat with his guests on stage.  In the 1980s, as the climate of political correctness continued to grow, Eddington and Wilcox refused to allow the episodes in which they appeared to be shown on British television again.

Musical guest stars

Hill also gave the first major exposure to some non-UK-based musical groups, including Luis Alberto del Paraná and Los Paraguayos. With few exceptions, most of the musical numbers did not make it to the U.S. syndicated series.

International airings
In 1976, Thames Television purchased a week of transmission time on two stations owned by RKO General that were offering a "Thames Week" schedule and were in the two largest American television markets: New York City's WOR-TV and KHJ-TV in Los Angeles. This introduced the show to American audiences and became immediately popular; subsequent screenings involved a series of re-edited half-hour programmes culled from the ITV specials. As a result of heavy editing for fear of FCC licence revocation, the early US versions of the show have far less risqué material than those broadcast in the UK, though some brief female nudity and subtle sexual innuendo was apparently acceptable.

The show was awarded the 'Special Prize of the City of Montreux' at the Rose d'Or festival in 1984. Selected sketches from the first four years (1969–1972) of the Thames run were also edited into a feature film, The Best of Benny Hill (1974).

In 1977, Hill produced a special in Australia (see below) that provided material for some scattered episodes of the U.S. half-hour syndicated edits. The cast of that Australian show included Barry Otto and Ron Shand.

The programme also aired on GBC TV in the British Overseas territory of Gibraltar.

In Spain, the programme was immensely popular in the early 1980s. With the arrival of the commercial stations, Telecinco, in its first guise, depended heavily on old programming, and The Benny Hill Show would usually air for 60–90 minutes every night before the 20:30 news programme.

In Chile, the programme was broadcast for Universidad de Chile Televisión from 1981 to 1990.

Repeats
The Benny Hill Show aired in one-hour portions (not corresponding to the original hour-long format), twice nightly on BBC America from March 1998 to May 2006, restoring much of the mature content not seen in previous American airings but also excising most of the musical segments. Half-hour edits also appeared on ITV.

As of July 2014, the show is being broadcast on Australia's 7Two. The show has also been aired in India on UTV, dubbed in various Indian languages.

Antenna TV, a network created for digital subchannels in the United States, started showing the show Friday and Saturday nights in three-hour blocks on New Year's Day, 1 January 2011. This version, while generally following the half-hour syndicated format, included many of the musical numbers.

As of 2017, the show is currently being broadcast on Makedonia TV (M.tv) in Greece.

Currently the show is also available on YouTube by the channel English Comedy since 29 March 2020.

From 2021, some of the Thames TV shows, including The Benny Hill Show are also being shown on the U.K. channel That's TV under license from Fremantle. Due to the saucy nature of the series, a warning is shown at the beginning of the programme and also after the advert break, due to the prospect of the content causing offence to modern viewers.

Cancellation
In May 1989, Thames Television's Head of Light Entertainment since March 1988, John Howard Davies, invited Hill in for a meeting. Having just returned from a triumphant Cannes TV festival, Hill assumed that they were to discuss details of a new series. Instead, Davies informed Hill that his programme would discontinue production, and that he was dismissing Hill himself. In an episode about Hill from the documentary series Living Famously, Davies stated there were three reasons why he did so: "The audiences were going down, the programme was costing a vast amount of money, and he (Hill) was looking a little tired." His shows had earned Thames £100 million, with a large percentage due to the success of his shows in the United States. At its peak in 1977, 21.10 million viewers in the U.K. watched Hill's show. In 1989, the last Thames episode attracted 9.58 million viewers. Despite declining ratings in the UK, the show was still one of Britain's most successful TV exports, airing in 97 other countries.

Even though it was a ratings winner in the 1970s and 80s, in the 21st Century The Benny Hill Show was not repeated in full on national TV for 20 years, until That's TV announced that the programme would feature in its Christmas schedule, alongside other ITV programmes like Beadle's About and Kenny Everett's New Year Specials.

Programme list
 The Benny Hill Show, broadcast on BBC Television/BBC 1 (1955, 1957–1958, 1961, 1964–1966, 1968) – 32 episodes were made (in black & white).
 The Benny Hill Show, made by ATV and broadcast on ITV (1957–1960, 1967) – Nine episodes were made (in b&w).
 The Benny Hill Show, made by Thames and broadcast on ITV (1969–1986, 1988–1989) – 58 episodes were made (in colour, except ep. 6-8, in b&w due to the Colour Strike).
 Benny Hill Down Under – 1977 special broadcast on Channel 10 – one episode (in colour).
 Benny Hill's World Tour: New York! - 1991 special broadcast on the USA Network - one episode (in colour).

Other programmes featuring Benny Hill
 Hi There!, broadcast on BBC TV (1951). One episode was made.
 The Centre Show, broadcast on BBC TV (1953). Seven episodes were made. After the first episode, this was retitled The Forces Show.
 Showcase, broadcast on BBC TV (1954). Eight episodes were made.
 Benny Hill, broadcast on BBC TV (1962–1963). Sitcom where Hill played a different role every week. 19 episodes were made.
 The Waiters (1969). 30-minute silent film.
 Eddie in August (1970). 25-minute silent film.
Omnibus Benny Hill - Clown Imperial BBC One (1991). An hour long documentary of his life, with commentary from celebrities.

DVD releases
In 2004, the hour-long Thames specials were released uncut (except for ad-break bumpers) in Region 1 DVD sets for the U.S. by A&E Home Video (under license from Thames, talkbackTHAMES and FremantleMedia International), entitled Benny Hill: Complete & Unadulterated. Each set represents multiple years of the show in order of original airings, with "Benny Hill Trivia Challenges", a booklet and extras. All 58 episodes of the Thames years (1969-1989) were showcased in the collection, but Hill's 1977 Australian TV special ("Down Under") was not, and remains unavailable on DVD.

In 2005, the Thames specials began to appear uncut (including the original ad-break bumpers) in Region 2 DVD sets, each representing one year and entitled The Benny Hill Annual. Sets for each year from 1970 through 1989 have been released on DVD by Network. Two box sets were released of the 1970–1979 Annuals and 1980–1989 Annuals, with a set containing all the Annuals "double bundled up together". 

In 2005, Warner Home Video released a collection of the surviving black-and-white half-hour episodes Hill did for the BBC in the 1950s and 1960s (roughly half of them still exist) on Region 1 DVD as Benny Hill: The Lost Years. In Australia, Via Vision released The Benny Hill Annuals complete box set (1970-1989) on August 3, 2022.

References

External links
 
 
 
 
 Benny's Place featuring Louise English & Hill's Angels

1955 British television series debuts
1989 British television series endings
1950s British television sketch shows
1960s British television sketch shows
1970s British television sketch shows
1980s British television sketch shows
BBC television sketch shows
Black-and-white British television shows
Cross-dressing in television
English-language television shows
ITV sketch shows
Television shows produced by Thames Television
Television shows shot at Teddington Studios